Hidden Valley, also known as Ski Estes Park, was a ski area near Estes Park, Colorado.  It became owned by the National Park Service, which eventually closed it in 1991.

Hidden Valley (or Ski Estes Park) was a local ski area attraction from 1955 - 1991, off of Trail Ridge Road, now in defunct status.

The National Park Service seemed reluctant about opening it at all, and seemed to have succumbed to local pressure. NPS landscape architect Harold G. Fowler happened to be involved in assessing its feasibility.

See also
Trail Ridge Road#Miscellanea

References

Buildings and structures in Larimer County, Colorado
Defunct ski areas and resorts in Colorado